Tetsuo Ochikubo (1923–1975), also known as Bob Ochikubo, was a Japanese-American painter, sculpture, and printmaker who was born in Waipahu, Hawaii, Honolulu county, Hawaii.  During the Second World War, he served with the 100th Battalion of the 442nd Regimental Combat Team.  After being discharged from the Army, he studied painting and design at the School of the Art Institute of Chicago and at the Art Students League of New York. In 1953, he spent a year in Japan, studying traditional brush painting and connecting with his ancestry.  He worked at Tamarind Institute in the 1960s and is best known for his entirely abstract paintings and lithographs.  Along with Satoru Abe, Bumpei Akaji, Edmund Chung, Jerry T. Okimoto, James Park, and Tadashi Sato, Ochikubo was a member of the Metcalf Chateau, a group of seven Asian-American artists with ties to Honolulu.  Ochikubo died in Kawaihae, Hawaii in 1975.

Education
 Waipahu High School, Waipahu, Oahu, Hawaii.
 University of Hawaii, 1946.
 Chicago Art Institute, 1947–48.
 Ray Vogue School of Art, Chicago, 1947–48.
 Art Students League, 1951–52, 1956–60.
 Private instruction in Oriental Brush Painting (with Takehiko Mohri, Tokyo, Japan, 1953).
 Pratt Institute, New York, 1960.

Positions held
 Instructor, (watercolor and painting), Adult Education Program, McKinley High School, Honolulu, Hawaii, 1950–51.
 Visiting Artist - Department of Art, University of Mississippi, University, Mississippi, 1960.
 Supervisor, Graphic Workshop, Art Students League, New York, 1960–61.
 Professor, Mary Washington College, University of Virginia, Fredericksburg, Virginia, 1961–63.
 Professor, School of Art, Syracuse University, 1964–72.
 National Endowment for the Arts, Artist in Residence, Hawaii, 1972.
 Professor, School of Art, University of Hawaii, Hilo, 1972–75.

Honors and distinctions
 Thekla M. Bernays Scholarship, Art Students League, 1956–57.
 John Hay Whitney Foundation Fellowship, 1957–58.
 John Simon Guggenheim Memorial Fellowship, 1958–59.
 Tamarind Lithography Workshop Fellowship, Los Angeles, 1960.

Selected permanent collections
 The Cincinnati Art Museum, Cincinnati, Ohio.
 Honolulu Museum of Art, Honolulu, Hawaii.
 Print Club (now called The Print Center), Philadelphia, Pennsylvania.
 Art Students League of New York, New York City, New York.
 The Library of Congress, Washington, D.C.
 Albright–Knox Art Gallery, Buffalo, New York.
 Mary Washington College, Williamsburg, Virginia.
 Chrysler Museum of Art, Provincetown, Massachusetts.
 Syracuse University, Syracuse, New York.
 Fine Arts Section, US Information Agency, Washington, D.C.
 Oswego State University, Oswego, New York.
 St. Lawrence University, Canton, New York.
 De Cordova Museum, Lincoln, Massachusetts.
 Hawaii State Foundation on Culture and the Arts, Honolulu, Hawaii.
 Hirshhorn Museum and Sculpture Garden, Smithsonian Institution, Washington, D.C.
 Fine Arts Museums of San Francisco, San Francisco, California.

Major commissions in Hawaii
 Hilo Intermediate School, Untitled, Bronze and aluminum sculpture, Hilo, Hawaii, 1972.
 Waiakeawaina Elementary School, Harmony, Copper and steel sculpture, Hilo, Hawaii, 1973.
 Kona Hospital, Altruism, Corten steel and enamel sculpture, Kona, Hawaii, 1975.

One man shows
 Library of Hawaii, Honolulu, Hawaii, 1949.
 Club 100, Memorial Building, Honolulu, Hawaii, 1952.
 Honolulu Y.B.A. Hall, Hawaii, 1953.
 Honolulu Academy of Arts, Hawaii, 1955.
 Columbia Museum, Columbia, South Carolina, 1959.
 The Gallery, Hawaii, 1959.
 Tweed Gallery, University of Minnesota, Duluth, 1960.
 University of Mississippi, Mississippi, 1960.
 Delta State College, Mississippi, 1960.
 Krasner Galleries, New York City, New York, 1958–72.
 Mary Washington College, Fredericksburg, Virginia, 1963.
 Franz Bader Galler, Washington, D.C., 1963.
 Print Club, Pennsylvania, 1964.
 Syracuse University, Syracuse, New York, 1964.
 Jewish Community Center, Syracuse, New York, 1966.
 Contemporary Art Center of Hawaii, Honolulu, Hawaii, 1973.

References
 Matsumoto, Lacy, "Hawaii artist honors late friend with exhibition - Satoru Abe to show his work alongside pieces by Jerry Okimoto at Nu'uanu Gallery", Honolulu Advertiser, July 28, 2008, D1.
 Mark, Steven, "Metcalf Chateau Show", Honolulu Star-Advertiser, July 27, 2014, F7.
 Schmeckebier, Laurence Eli, Tetsuo Ochikubo, paintings, drawings, lithographs, Syracuse, N.Y., School of Art, Syracuse University, 1964.
 Yoshihara, Lisa A., Collective Visions, 1967-1997, An Exhibition Celebrating the 30th Anniversary of the State Foundation on Culture and the Arts, Art in Public Places Program, Presented at the Honolulu Academy of Arts, September 3-October 12, 1997, Honolulu, State Foundation on Culture and the Arts, 1997, p. 55.
 Haar, Francis, & Turnbull, Mary, Artists of Hawaii, Volume 2, The State Foundation on Culture and the Arts and The University Press of Hawaii/Honolulu, 1977, pp 54 to 58.
 Hartwell, Patricia L. (editor), Retrospective 1967-1987, Hawaii State Foundation on Culture and the Arts, Honolulu, Hawaii, 1987, p. 60
 Morse, Marcia, Legacy: Facets of Island Modernism, Honolulu, Honolulu Academy of Arts, 2001, pp. 19, 64–69.
 Wechsler, Jeffrey, Asian Traditions / Modern Expressions, Asian American Artists and Abstraction, 1945 - 1970, Presented at Jane Voorhees Zimmerli Art Museum, New Brunswick, New Jersey March 23 - July 31, 1997, Chicago Cultural Center, Chicago, Illinois, September 6 - November 2, 1997, Fisher Gallery, University of Southern California, Los Angeles, and the Japanese American National Museum, Los Angeles (two-site presentation), December 10, 1997 - February 14, 1998.
 Cazimero, Momi W., & Hartwell, Patricia L., & Peebles, Douglas, Retrospective, 1967 - 1987, Presented at AMFAC Plaza Exhibition Room, The State Foundation on Culture and the Arts, 1988.
 Munson, Gloria Ursal, Art in Public Places: Hawaii State Foundation on Culture and the Arts and its cultural significance, University of Hawaii, 1992.

Footnotes

1923 births
1975 deaths
20th-century American painters
American male painters
American artists of Japanese descent
United States Army soldiers
United States Army personnel of World War II
American military personnel of Japanese descent
School of the Art Institute of Chicago alumni
Printmakers from Hawaii
Painters from Hawaii
20th-century American printmakers
20th-century American male artists
Illinois Institute of Art – Chicago alumni